Massis is a French surname that may refer to
Alfredo De Massis, Italian management and organization scientist 
Annick Massis (born 1958), French soprano singer
Henri Massis (1886–1970), French essayist, literary critic and literary historian
John Massis (1940–1988), Flemish strongman

French-language surnames